Nosa Rex Okunzuwa, known by his stage name Nosa Rex and also as Baba Rex, is a Nigerian film and TV actor and film producer.

Early life and education
Nosa Rex Okunzuwa was born in Benin City, Edo State, and earned a bachelor's degree in Mechanical Engineering from the Ambrose Alli University in Ekpoma in 2009.

Film career
He started working as an actor in 2010 after completing his national service. His first movie appearance was in Gazza Treasure by Derek Osonwa. In addition to film work, he played Terwase in the TV series Jenifa's Diary created by Funke Akindele.

Production
He is CEO of the film production house Big Things Development.

Other work
Okunzuwa also has a clothing line and is an automobile dealer; he assists his wife with her food business. In 2020 he became a brand ambassador for the aphrodisiac Mydsiac.

Personal life
Okunzuwa was married to Deborah Raphael Nwokocha on 22 August 2015; they have a daughter and a son.

Filmography
Gazza Treasure (2010)
Princess Natasha (2015)
Joy of Natasha (2015)
Agwonma (2015)
Drum of Death (2016)
My Best Friends Wedding (2016)
Rise of the Titan (2017)
Omuwa (2017)
Eyes of the Kingdom (2017)
My Love and I (2017)
My Own Sweat (2017)
Nneka my Princess (2017)
The Road Not Taken (2017)
Perfect (2017)
My Only Inheritance (2017)
Help that Kill (2017)
God of Elijah (2017)
We Meet Again (2017)
Bread of Sorrow (2017)
Caro, the Iron Bender (2017)
Lagos Real Fake Life (2018)
Inherited Cursed (2018)
Feel My Heart (2018)
Pains of Royalty (2018)
The Right Time (2018)
A Fight to Live 1 (2018)
Not My Throne (2018)
Unknown Damage (2018)
Wrong Choice (2018) 
Evil Mindset (2018)
Strength of Love (2018)
Odida Kingdom (2018)
Onitsha Housewife (2018)
Tears of Vengeance (2018)
Family Commander (2018)
Dooshima''' (2018)Onaedo Kingdom (2018)The Mortal Bride (2019)In Love with my Family Cook (2019)Royal Ambition (2019)Oath from Birth (2019)Your Dream Girl (2019)Royal Sin (2019)Family Deliverance (2019)Tears of a Super Rich Bachelor (2019)Sacred Twist (2019) Rags to Robe (2019)Omo Ghetto: The Saga (2020)Maduka Daughters (2020)Love Upon the Hills (2020)Crisis in London (2020)Breaking Chains (2020)The Hostage (2020) Family Business (2020)The Broken King (2020)Agony of a Widow (2020)The Signs of Misfortune (2020)The Prisoners (2020)The Brothers (2020)Greater Than Love (2020)Our Lying Husbands (2020)Her Bride Price (2020)Kiss of Betrayal (2020)Priority of Love (2020)Quarantine Husbands (2020)The Brothers (2020)Nosa, The Preacher Man (2020)Professional Chefs (2020)Seasonal Love (2021)Who Would Be My Chosen Bride (2021)From Prince to a Local Driver (2021)The Gatekeeper and the Beautiful Ghost (2021)Nosa. the Village Town Crier (2021)From Prince to a Local Driver (2021)

Television seriesJenifa's Diary (2015)From Poor to Billionaire (2021)Benefit Boys'' (2021)

Awards

See also
List of Nigerian actors

References

External links

Living people
Year of birth missing (living people)
Nigerian male film actors
21st-century Nigerian male actors
People from Edo State
Nigerian male television actors
Nigerian male comedians
Nigerian film producers
Nigerian chief executives
Nigerian media personalities
Nigerian television actors
Ambrose Alli University alumni
Nigerian film award winners
20th-century births